Cansfield High School is a coeducational secondary school located in the Ashton-in-Makerfield area of the Metropolitan Borough of Wigan, Greater Manchester, England.

History 
Ashton Central School was founded in the early 20th century on Cansfield Grove, which is the current location of Cansfield High School. The Central School was divided into a girls' school and a boys' school. At the same time Ashton Grammar School was located to the north of this, bounded by Old Road, Whitledge Green and Wigan Road. A small brook (Jack Brook) divided the two schools (Central and Grammar) from each other. This brook has since been buried in a culvert under the school field. An O.S. map of 1906 shows the Grammar School, but the Central School had not yet been built. 
During the 1960s the  Grammar School was relocated to the site currently occupied by Byrchall High School. The former buildings of the Grammar School and those of the Central School were amalgamated to form Ashton Secondary School. Until 1974 the school was part of District 13 of the Lancashire County Council, transferring in April of that year to the newly created Wigan Metropolitan Borough with the implementation of the Local Government Act (1972). These changes brought into being Cansfield High School, a comprehensive school, under the headship of Mr C. A. Brand. New building at this time saw the school site partly occupied by Ashton Leisure Centre, a situation that persists to this day. Cansfield High School itself originally consisted of two parts, the current location on Cansfield Grove, and a second location situated opposite Whitledge Green. Many of the original buildings on both sites were made of wood, much of which had been constructed in the inter-war period. They had been added to by the concrete framed Horsa huts built for the raising of the school leaving age in 1944 and some demountables. In the period from the 1970s up to 1990, the school was organised by having 1st to 3rd year students situated in the north campus (Whitledge Green end), whilst the 4th and final year students were situated in the  buildings on Cansfield Grove. 
A large double storey classroom block was built in 1986-1988 at the Cansfield Grove end of the site, enabling the school to be collected into that area, and the wooden buildings were removed from the Cansfield Grove end of the site. The Whitledge Green end of the site was in use up to about 1989; it was then demolished and this part of the land was sold for housing. Further building work since 1990 has seen several new classroom blocks and a new canteen added to the Cansfield Grove end of the site, together with the final eradication of the Horsa huts.

Past headmasters
 To 1974 : Mr S Price
 1974-1988: Mr C A Brand
 1988-1990: Acting headteachers Mr S Wall and Mr D Parfitt
 1990-1995: Mrs H G Gregory
 1995-2018: Mr M Southworth
 2018–Present: Dr. Geoff Baker

Uniform
Cansfield's uniform consists of a royal blue tailored blazer with a silver lion emblem on the left chest. The tie is royal blue with light blue and white stripes and the silver lion logo on the top of the tie, just below the knot. Students must wear a white shirt or blouse, with a black skirt or trousers. Black or white socks are to be worn. Students wear black shoes only.

References

External links 
 
Ofsted report
BBC school performance tables

Secondary schools in the Metropolitan Borough of Wigan
Community schools in the Metropolitan Borough of Wigan
Ashton-in-Makerfield